Coast Guard Air Station Los Angeles (CGAS Los Angeles) was a United States Coast Guard air station located at Los Angeles International Airport (LAX) in Los Angeles, California. CGAS Los Angeles was activated in 1962, and was deactivated in 2016.

Missions
CGAS Los Angeles missions included search and rescue, homeland security, and environmental protection.

Homeland security was also an important mission of CGAS Los Angeles. Helicopters from the base patrolled the west coast of the United States from Dana Point to Morro Bay. The Port of Los Angeles and the Port of Long Beach also lied within the station's patrol area.

History
CGAS Los Angeles was founded in August 1962 through the combined efforts of the Los Angeles Chamber of Commerce, U.S. Senator Thomas Kuchel, and U.S. Representative James Roosevelt.

In May 1963, the unit switched to three HH-52A Seaguard helicopters. These helicopters were flown for 24 years.

In September 2016, CGAS Los Angeles was closed when the lease on the existing facility at Los Angeles International Airport ended. Administratively, its component units were relocated to Naval Air Station Point Mugu and merged with/became a satellite of the Coast Guard Air Station San Francisco. This allowed LAX to accommodate the planned improvements for LAX's midfield, including the Midfield Satellite Concourse North (MSC North) terminal.

References

External links 

 Official  Coast Guard Air Station−CGAS Los Angeles website
 HH-65 Air Stations

Los Angeles International Airport
United States Coast Guard Air Stations
Military facilities in Greater Los Angeles
1962 establishments in California
2016 disestablishments in California